The National Library of Jordan is the legal deposit and copyright library for Jordan
It was founded in 1977

History
 1977: Establishing the Directorate of Libraries and National Documents.
 1990: The Directorate of Libraries and National Documents was replaced by two new entities:
 Department of the National Library.
 Documentation Center
 1994: Both the department of the National Library and Documentation Center were merged to be a separate department connected to the Minister of Culture under the name the Department of the National Library.

Department of the National Library tasks
 National intellectual product promotion and preservation.
 Collecting intellectual product mainly related to the National Jordanian Heritage. Other intellectual product area of interest: Arab World, Arabic & Islamic civilization, and Human Heritage in general.
 Preserving documents from different public institutions, documents relevant to Jordan in addition to private documents.
 Providing depository services.
 Issuing the Jordanian National Bibliography.
 Publishing and facilitating material related to libraries' work.
 Coordinating the work of public libraries.
 Allowing access to researchers.
 Mutual lending with other national, regional & international libraries.
 Organizing different cultural events.
 Exchanging & gifting materials.
 Cooperation with international entities in relation to library services.

References

External links
 National Library Website

Jordanian culture
Jordan
Libraries in Jordan
Libraries established in 1977
Buildings and structures in Amman